The Ordeal of Rosetta is a 1918 American silent drama film directed by Emile Chautard and starring Alice Brady, Crauford Kent and Ormi Hawley.

Cast
 Alice Brady as Rosetta / Lola Gelardi (twins) 
 Crauford Kent as Aubrey Hapgood 
 Ormi Hawley as Ruth Hapgood 
 Henry Leone as Professor Gelardi 
 Maude Turner Gordon as Mrs. Hapgood 
 Hazel Washburn as Mildred Sanders 
 Edmund Burns as Dick 
 George Henry as Theatrical Agent

References

Bibliography
 Giorgio Bertellini. Italy in Early American Cinema: Race, Landscape, and the Picturesque. Indiana University Press, 2010.

External links

1918 films
1918 drama films
Silent American drama films
Films directed by Emile Chautard
American silent feature films
1910s English-language films
American black-and-white films
Selznick Pictures films
1910s American films